The 2002 Shell Turbo Chargers season was the 18th season of the franchise in the Philippine Basketball Association (PBA).

Draft picks

Transactions

Summary
The Shell Turbo Chargers find it hard to score victories after another for the 2002 season. After winning over Coca-Cola, 90–82 on February 17, the Turbo Chargers lost eight in a row and bowed out of contention in the Governor's Cup, they won their last game against Sta.Lucia, 95–76, on the last day of eliminations on April 21.

They lost their first three assignments during the Commissioner's Cup but made it through the quarterfinal round as the 8th seeded team and were ousted by Batang Red Bull. With center Benjie Paras sitting out for most of their games during the season, Shell continued its non-semifinal appearance in the All-Filipino Cup, the Turbo Chargers lost to Sta.Lucia Realtors in a do-or-die game for the 6th spot in the quarterfinal round.

Roster

Elimination round

Games won

References

Shell Turbo Chargers seasons
Shell